Gustavo Adrián Ramírez Rojas (born May 13, 1990) is a Paraguayan professional footballer who currently plays for Rosario Central.

Honours
Pachuca
Liga MX: Clausura 2016

Individual
Liga de Expansión MX Golden Boot (Shared): Apertura 2020
Liga de Expansión MX Best XI: Apertura 2020

External links
 ascensomx.net
 

1990 births
Living people
Paraguayan footballers
Paraguayan expatriate footballers
Club León footballers
Lobos BUAP footballers
Dorados de Sinaloa footballers
Alebrijes de Oaxaca players
C.F. Pachuca players
Tecos F.C. footballers
Mineros de Zacatecas players
Cimarrones de Sonora players
Correcaminos UAT footballers
Club Atlético Zacatepec players
Atlético Morelia players
Deportes Tolima footballers
Rosario Central footballers
Liga MX players
Ascenso MX players
Categoría Primera A players
Argentine Primera División players
Association football forwards
Paraguayan expatriate sportspeople in Mexico
Paraguayan expatriate sportspeople in Colombia
Paraguayan expatriate sportspeople in Argentina
Expatriate footballers in Mexico
Expatriate footballers in Colombia
Expatriate footballers in Argentina